Normanci   is a village in Croatia. It is connected by the D2 highway.

Name
The name of the village in Croatian is plural. Until 1991 the village name was Vučkovac.

References

Populated places in Osijek-Baranja County